is a Japanese regional bank that is headquartered in Mito city, Ibaraki Prefecture.  The bank is relatively large among Japanese regional lenders, and operates branches throughout the Kantō region.  In addition to branches in Miyagi, Fukushima, Chiba, Saitama, Tokyo, and Osaka prefectures, the bank also operates a representative office in Shanghai.  While the bank has many stakeholders, prominent shareholders include the Bank of Tokyo-Mitsubishi, along with several major Japanese insurance companies
     
Ibaraki Prefecture is located to the northeast of Tokyo and has a total population of 3,976,000. Although the prefecture ranks only 24th in size among Japan's 47 prefectures, it ranks 4th in terms of usable area. It is therefore one of the leading producers of agricultural products and has a largely rural population. As a consequence of this, Joyo Bank has had to maintain a large but inefficient branch network. This feature has helped the bank by limiting competition from other banks, with the result that Joyo Bank has been able to command a 38% market share of deposits and 42% share of loans in Ibaraki.

Profile
As of March 31, 2005

Assets: Approximately 6.1 trillion yen (approximately US$56 billion)
Employees: 3,512
Branches: 145 branches, 25 sub-branches, 1 overseas representative office
President: Kunio Onizawa
Member: Regional Banks Association of Japan

History
These two institutions merged on July 30, 1935 to form the Joyo Bank. The year 2005 saw the 70th anniversary of this event. The bank has merged with several other regional banks over the next decade. During the 1980s and 1990s, the Joyo Bank opened up representative offices in major markets such as New York City (1987 – 2002), London (1982 – 2000), Hong Kong (1994 – 1999), and Shanghai (est. 1996). Of these, only the Shanghai office remains open.

External links
 Official site 
 English part of official site

Regional banks of Japan
Companies formerly listed on the Tokyo Stock Exchange